

Events

January

 January 1 – The Soviet Union ceases to demand war reparations from West Germany.
 January 3 – The Italian broadcaster RAI officially begins transmitting.
 January 7 – Georgetown-IBM experiment: The first public demonstration of a machine translation system is held in New York, at the head office of IBM.
 January 10 – BOAC Flight 781, a de Havilland Comet jet plane, disintegrates in mid-air due to metal fatigue, and crashes in the Mediterranean near Elba; all 35 people on board are killed.
 January 12 – Avalanches in Austria kill more than 200.
 January 15 – Mau Mau leader Waruhiu Itote is captured in Kenya.
 January 17 – In Yugoslavia, Milovan Đilas, one of the leading members of the League of Communists of Yugoslavia, is relieved of his duties.
 January 20 – The US-based National Negro Network is established, with 46 member radio stations.
 January 25 – The foreign ministers of the United States, Britain, France and the Soviet Union meet at the Berlin Conference.

February

 February 10 – After authorizing $385 million over the $400 million already budgeted for military aid to Vietnam, President of the United States Dwight D. Eisenhower warns against his country's intervention in Vietnam.
 February 19 – 1954 transfer of Crimea: The Soviet Politburo of the Soviet Union orders the transfer of the Crimean Oblast from the Russian SFSR to the Ukrainian SSR (Invaded and annexed by Russia in 2014).
 February 23 – The first mass vaccination of children against polio begins in Pittsburgh, United States.
 February 25 – Lt. Col. Gamal Abdel Nasser becomes premier of Egypt.

March 

 March 1
 U.S. officials announce that a hydrogen bomb test (Castle Bravo) has been conducted, on Bikini Atoll in the Pacific Ocean.
 U.S. Capitol shooting incident: Four Puerto Rican nationalists open fire in the United States House of Representatives chamber and wound 5; they are apprehended by security guards.
 March 9 – American journalists Edward R. Murrow and Fred W. Friendly produce a 30-minute See It Now documentary, entitled A Report on Senator Joseph McCarthy.
 March 12 – Finland and Germany officially end their state of war.
 March 13 – Việt Minh forces under General Võ Nguyên Giáp began a massive artillery bombardment on the French military, beginning the Battle of Dien Bien Phu, the climactic battle of the First Indochina War.
 March 19 – Joey Giardello knocks out Willie Tory at Madison Square Garden in the first televised boxing prize fight to be shown in colour.
 March 23 – In Vietnam, the Viet Minh capture the main airstrip of Dien Bien Phu. The remaining French Army units there are partially isolated.
 March 25
 The 26th Academy Awards Ceremony is held.
 The Soviet Union recognises the sovereignty of East Germany. Soviet troops remain in the country.
 March 27 – The Castle Romeo nuclear test explosion is executed at Bikini Atoll, in the Marshall Islands.
 March 28 
 The trial of A. L. Zissu and 12 other Zionist leaders ends with harsh sentences in Communist Romania.
 Puerto Rico's first television station, WKAQ-TV, commences broadcasting.
 March 29 – A C-47 transport with French nurse Geneviève de Galard on board is wrecked on the runway at Dien Bien Phu.
 March 30 – The first operational subway line in Canada opens in Toronto.

April

 April 1
 The U.S. Congress and President Dwight D. Eisenhower authorize the founding of the United States Air Force Academy in Colorado.
 South Point School in India is founded, and becomes the largest school in the world by 1992.
 April 3 – Petrov Affair: Diplomat Vladimir Petrov defects from the Soviet Union and asks for political asylum in Australia.
 April 4 – Legendary symphony conductor Arturo Toscanini experiences a lapse of memory during a concert. At this concert's end, his retirement is announced, and he never conducts in public again.
 April 7 – Dwight D. Eisenhower gives his "domino theory" speech, during a news conference.
 April 8 – A Royal Canadian Air Force Canadair Harvard collides with a Trans-Canada Air Lines Canadair North Star over Moose Jaw, Saskatchewan, killing 37 people.
 April 11
 This day is denoted as the most boring day in the 20th century by True Knowledge, an answer engine developed by William Tunstall-Pedoe. No significant newsworthy events, births, or deaths are known to have happened on this day.
 In a general election in Belgium, the dominant Christian Social Party wins 95 of the 212 seats in the Chamber of Representatives, and 49 of the 106 seats in the Senate. The government led by Jean Van Houtte loses their majority in parliament. The two other main parties, the Socialist and Liberal Party, subsequently form a rare "purple" government, with Achille Van Acker as Prime Minister.
 April 12 – Bill Haley & His Comets record "Rock Around the Clock" in their first session for American Decca in New York City; it is released on May 20 as a B-side, but only in 1955 becomes a #1 hit, helping to initiate the rock and roll craze.
 April 14
 Aneurin Bevan resigns from the British Labour Party's Shadow Cabinet in protest over his party's failure to oppose the rearmament of West Germany.
 A Soviet spy ring in Australia is unveiled.
 April 16 – Vice President Richard Nixon announces that the United States may be "putting our own boys in Indochina regardless of Allied support".
 April 22
 The 1951 United Nations Convention Relating to the Status of Refugees comes into force, defining the status of refugees and setting out the basis for granting right of asylum.
 Senator Joseph McCarthy begins hearings investigating the United States Army for being "soft" on Communism.
 April 26
 An international conference on Korea and Indo-China opens in Geneva.
 Akira Kurosawa's Seven Samurai is released in Japan.
 April 28 – U.S. Secretary of State John Foster Dulles accuses Communist China of sending combat troops to Indo-China to train Viet Minh guerrillas.

May

 May 1 – The Unification Church is founded in South Korea.
 May 4 – General Alfredo Stroessner deposes Federico Chávez in a coup d'état in Paraguay; from August 15 he will hold the office of President until 1989.
 May 6 – Roger Bannister runs the first sub-four minute mile, in Oxford, England.
 May 7 – Vietnam War (run-up): The Battle of Dien Bien Phu ends in a French defeat (the battle began on March 13).
 May 8 – The Asian Football Confederation (AFC) is formed in Manila, Philippines.
 May 11 – U.S. Secretary of State John Foster Dulles declares that Indochina is important but not essential to the security of Southeast Asia, thus ending any prospect of American intervention on the side of France.
 May 14 
 The Boeing 707 airplane is released, after about 2 years of development.
 The Hague Convention for the Protection of Cultural Property in the Event of Armed Conflict was adopted in The Hague, Netherlands. 
 May 15 – The Latin Union (Unión Latina) is created by the Convention of Madrid. Its member countries use the five Romance languages: Italian, French, Spanish, Portuguese, and Romanian. It will suspend operations in 2012.
 May 17
 Brown v. Board of Education (347 US 483 1954): The U.S. Supreme Court rules unanimously that segregated schools are unconstitutional.
 The Royal Commission on the Petrov Affair in Australia begins its inquiry.
 Adnan Menderes of the Democratic Party forms the new (21st) government of Turkey.
 May 20 – Chiang Kai-shek is re-elected as the president of the Republic of China, by the National Assembly.
 May 22 – The common Nordic Labour Market act is signed.
 May 26 – A fire on board the U.S. Navy aircraft carrier USS Bennington, off Narragansett Bay, Massachusetts, kills 103 sailors.
 May 29
 1954 Australian federal election: Robert Menzies' Liberal/Country Coalition Government is re-elected with a decreased majority, defeating the Labor Party led by H.V. Evatt. The election has come shortly after the Petrov Affair, arguably helping the Government survive what was initially predicted to be a defeat.
 Creation and first meeting of the Bilderberg Group.
 Diane Leather becomes the first woman to run a sub-five minute mile, in Birmingham, England.

June

 June 6 – The grand opening of the sculpture of Yuriy Dolgorukiy takes place in Moscow (this statue is one of the main monuments of Moscow).
 June 7 – English cryptanalyst, mathematician and computer scientist Alan Turing, age 41, commits suicide by cyanide poisoning.
 June 9 – McCarthyism: Joseph N. Welch, special counsel for the United States Army, lashes out at Senator Joseph McCarthy, during hearings on whether Communism has infiltrated the Army, saying, "Have you, at long last, no decency?"
 June 14 – The words "under God" are added to the United States Pledge of Allegiance.
 June 15 – The UEFA (Union of European Football Associations) is formed in Basel, Switzerland.
 June 17 – A CIA-engineered military coup occurs in Guatemala.
 June 18 – Pierre Mendès France becomes prime minister of France.
 June 22 
 Sarah Mae Flemming is expelled from a bus in South Carolina, for sitting in a white-only section.
 Parker–Hulme murder case: Pauline Parker, 16 and her friend Juliet Hulme, 15, bludgeon Parker's mother to death using a brick, at Victoria Park in New Zealand.
 June 27
 Guatemalan President Jacobo Árbenz steps down in a CIA-sponsored military coup, triggering a bloody civil war that continues for more than 35 years.
 The world's first atomic power station opens at Obninsk, near Moscow.

July

 July 1
 The Common Nordic Labor Market Act comes into effect.
 The United States officially begins using the international unit of the nautical mile, equal to 6,076.11549 ft. or 1,852 meters.
 July 4
Food rationing in Great Britain ends, with the lifting of restrictions on sale and purchase of meat, 14 years after it began early in World War II, and nearly a decade after the war's end.
"Miracle of Bern": West Germany beats Hungary 3–2 to win the 1954 FIFA World Cup.
 July 10 – Peter Thomson becomes the first Australian to win the British Open Golf Championship.
 July 15
 The Boeing 367-80 (or Dash 80), prototype of the Boeing 707 series, makes its maiden flight.
 Juan Fangio, Argentine driver for German Grand Prix team Mercedes-Benz, makes a new fastest lap of the Silverstone Circuit, with an average speed of 100.35 mph, the previous record being 100.16 mph.
 July 19 – Release of Elvis Presley's first single, "That's All Right", by Sun Records (recorded July 5 in Memphis, Tennessee).
 July 21 – First Indochina War: The Geneva Conference sends French forces to the south, and Vietnamese forces to the north, of a ceasefire line, and calls for elections to decide the government for all of Vietnam by July 1956. Failure to abide by the terms of the agreement leads to the establishment of the de facto regimes of North Vietnam and South Vietnam, and the Vietnam War.
 July 29 – The Fellowship of the Ring, the first of three volumes in J.R.R. Tolkien's epic fantasy novel, The Lord of the Rings, is published in London.
 July 31 – 1954 Italian expedition to K2: Italian mountaineers Lino Lacedelli and Achille Compagnoni become the first to reach the summit of the second highest mountain in the world, in the Karakoram range.

August

 August 1 – The First Indochina War ends with the Vietnam People's Army in North Vietnam, the Vietnamese National Army in South Vietnam, the Kingdom of Cambodia in Cambodia, and the Kingdom of Laos in Laos, emerging victorious against the French Army.
 August 6 – Emilie Dionne, one of the Dionne quintuplets, dies of asphyxiation following an epileptic seizure. She is the first of the five to perish; three live into the 21st century.
 August 16 – The first issue of Sports Illustrated magazine is published in the United States.
 August 23 – A United States Air Force Lockheed C-130 Hercules makes its first flight at Burbank, California, manufactured by Lockheed Martin.
 August 24 – Brazilian president Getúlio Vargas commits suicide, after being accused of involvement in a conspiracy to murder his chief political opponent, Carlos Lacerda.

September

 September 6 – The Southeast Asia Treaty Organization (SEATO) treaty is signed in Manila, Philippines.
 September 8 – SEATO is established in Bangkok, Thailand.
 September 9 – The 6.7  Chlef earthquake shakes northern Algeria, with a maximum Mercalli intensity of XI (Extreme). The shock destroys Orléansville, leaving 1,243–1,409 dead, and 5,000 injured.
 September 11 – The Miss America Pageant is broadcast on television for the first time.
 September 14
 The Soviet Union carries out the Totskoye nuclear exercise.
 English composer Benjamin Britten's chamber opera version of The Turn of the Screw receives its world premiere, at the Teatro La Fenice in Venice, Italy.
 September 15 – Black Wednesday in air travel: severe delays to flights, due to bad weather, occur along the East Coast of the United States.
 September 17 – William Golding's allegorical dystopian novel Lord of the Flies is published in London.
 September 18 – Finnish president J. K. Paasikivi is the first Western head of state to be awarded the highest honor of the Soviet Union, the Order of Lenin.
 September 20 – The first Moomins comic strip is published in the London newspaper The Evening News.
 September 25 – Footscray Football Club wins their first Australian Football League Grand Final.
 September 26 – Japanese ferry Tōya Maru sinks during a typhoon in the Tsugaru Strait. More than 1,100 people are killed, 7 other ships are wrecked, and at least nine others seriously damaged.
 September 27 – The Tonight Show first airs on live television on NBC in the United States being the first late night talk show.
 September 30 – The , the first nuclear-powered submarine in the world, is commissioned into the U.S. Navy.

October

 October 11
 Pre-Vietnam War: The Viet Minh takes control of North Vietnam.
 Hurricane Hazel crosses over Haiti, killing 1,000.
 October 15 – Hurricane Hazel makes U.S. landfall; it is the only recorded Category 4 hurricane to strike as far north as North Carolina
 October 18
 Texas Instruments announces the development of the first commercial transistor radio. The Regency TR-1 goes on sale the following month.
 The comic strip Hi and Lois, by Mort Walker and Dik Browne, is launched in the United States.
 October 23
 West Germany joins NATO.
 Paris Agreement sets up the Western European Union to implement the Treaty of Brussels (1948), providing for mutual self-defence and other collaboration between Belgium, France, West Germany, Italy, Luxembourg, the Netherlands and the United Kingdom.
 October 25 – Landslides caused by heavy rains hit Salerno, Italy, killing about 300.
 October 26 – Muslim Brotherhood member Mahmoud Abdul Latif tries to kill Gamal Abdel Nasser.
 October 31 – Algerian War of Independence: The Algerian National Liberation Front begins a revolt against French rule.

November

 November 1 – The FLN attacks representative and public buildings of the French colonial power.
 November 2 
 The dock workers' strike in the UK comes to an end.
 The radio program Hancock's Half Hour, a pioneer in situation comedy, is first broadcast on BBC Radio (a television version will follow in 1956).
 November 3 – The first Godzilla film premieres in Tokyo.
 November 5 – Japan and Burma sign a peace treaty in Rangoon, to end their long-extinct state of war.
 November 10 – U.S. President Dwight D. Eisenhower dedicates the USMC War Memorial (Iwo Jima Memorial), at the Arlington National Cemetery.
 November 12 – The main immigration port-of-entry in New York Harbor at Ellis Island closes permanently.
 November 13 – Great Britain defeats France, to capture the first ever Rugby League World Cup in Paris in front of around 30,000 spectators
 November 14 – Egyptian president Muhammad Naguib is deposed, and Gamal Abdel Nasser replaces him.
 November 22 –  Berman v. Parker (348 U.S. 26): The U.S. Supreme Court upholds the federal slum clearance and urban renewal programs.
 November 23 – The Dow Jones Industrial Average rises 3.27 points, or 0.86 percent, closing at an all-time high of 382.74. More significantly, this is the first time the Dow has surpassed its peak level, reached just before the Wall Street Crash of 1929.
 November 30 – In Sylacauga, Alabama, a four-kilogram piece of the Hodges Meteorite crashes through the roof of a house and badly bruises a napping woman, in the first documented case of an object from outer space hitting a person.

December

 December 1 – The first Hyatt Hotel, The Hyatt House Los Angeles, opens on the grounds of Los Angeles International Airport. It is the first hotel in the world built on an airport property.
 December 2
 Red Scare: The United States Senate votes 67–22 to condemn Joseph McCarthy, for "conduct that tends to bring the Senate into dishonor and disrepute."
 The Taiwan-United States Mutual Defense Treaty is signed.
 December 4 – The first Burger King opens in Miami, Florida.
 December 15 – The Netherlands Antilles is created out of the Dutch Caribbean nations. It is dissolved between 1986 and 2010.
 December 23 – J. Hartwell Harrison and Joseph Murray perform the world's first successful kidney transplantation, in Boston, Massachusetts.
 December 24 – Laos gains full independence from France.

Date titles
 New Zealand engineer Sir William Hamilton develops the first pump-jet engine (the "Hamilton Jet") capable of propelling a jetboat.
 The first electric drip brew coffeemaker is patented in Germany and named the Wigomat after its inventor Gottlob Widmann.
 The Boy Scouts of America desegregates on the basis of race.
 Gerbils (Meriones unguiculatus) are brought to the United States by Dr. Victor Schwentker.
 The case of Lothar Malskat, who had admitted that he had painted the supposedly antique frescoes in Marienkirche himself, goes to trial.
 The TV dinner is introduced, by American entrepreneur Gerry Thomas.
 In South Vietnam, the Viet Minh is reorganised into the Viet Cong.
 After the death of Joseph Stalin, the Soviet Union starts releasing political prisoners and deportees from its Gulag prison camps.

Births

January

 January 1
 Thomas Aisu, Ugandan physician, educator (d. 2018)
 Djimrangar Dadnadji, 16th prime minister of Chad (d. 2019)
 January 2 – Henry Bonilla, American politician
 January 3
 Ned Lamont, American politician
 Ross the Boss, American heavy metal/punk guitarist
 January 4
 Tina Knowles, African-American fashion designer; mother of R&B singers Beyoncé and Solange Knowles
 Dave "The Devilfish" Ulliott, English professional poker player
 January 5 – Alex English, American basketball player
 January 6 – Anthony Minghella, British film, theatre director (d. 2008)
 January 7
 Jodi Long, American actress
 José María Vitier, Cuban music composer, pianist
 January 8 – Julieta Castellanos, Honduran sociologist
 January 11 – Kailash Satyarthi, Indian activist, Nobel Peace Prize laureate
 January 11 - Balachandra Menon, Indian Malayalam film director and actor
 January 12 – Howard Stern, American radio host
 January 13 – Trevor Rabin, South African–American musician
 January 14 – Masanobu Fuchi, Japanese professional wrestler
 January 15 – Jose Dalisay, Jr., Filipino writer
 January 16 – Morten P. Meldal, Danish chemist, Nobel Prize laureate
 January 19
 Ted DiBiase, American professional wrestler
 Katey Sagal, American actress and singer 
 Katharina Thalbach, German actress
 Yumi Matsutōya, Japanese singer-songwriter
 January 21 – Thomas de Maizière, German politician
 January 22 – Peter Pilz, Austrian politician
 January 23
 Franco De Vita, Venezuelan singer, songwriter
 Edward Ka-Spel, British/Dutch singer and songwriter (The Legendary Pink Dots)
 January 28
 Peter Lampe, German theologian, historian
 Bruno Metsu, French football coach (d. 2013)
 Kaneto Shiozawa, Japanese voice actor (d. 2000)
 Willy Telavi, 11th prime minister of Tuvalu
 January 29
 Yukinobu Hoshino, Japanese cartoonist
 Oprah Winfrey, African-American actress, talk show hostess, producer and publisher
 January 31 – Mark Slavin, Israeli wrestler (d. 1972)

February

 February 1 – Bill Mumy, American actor, musician (Lost In Space)
 February 2 – Christie Brinkley, American model
 February 4 – Andrei Karlov, Russian diplomat (d. 2016)
 February 7 – Dieter Bohlen, German music producer and singer-songwriter (Modern Talking, Blue System)
 February 9 – Gina Rinehart, Australian mining tycoon
 February 11 – Noriyuki Asakura, Japanese composer
 February 12
 Joseph Jordania, Georgian-Australian musicologist, academic
 Evangelos Basiakos, Greek politician, long term MP, and minister
 Tzimis Panousis, Greek comedian, singer, and author
 February 13 – Donnie Moore, American baseball player (d. 1989)
 February 15 – Matt Groening, American cartoonist (The Simpsons)
 February 16
 Iain Banks, Scottish author (d. 2013)
 Michael Holding, Jamaican cricket player and commentator
 Margaux Hemingway, American fashion model and actress (d. 1996)
 February 17
 Rene Russo, American actress, fashion model
 Yuji Takada, Japanese free-style wrestler
 Brian Houston, Australian-New Zealand pastor, author and founder of Hillsong Church
 February 18
 John Travolta, American actor
 Jalaluddin Hassan, Malaysian actor
 February 19
 Messaouda Boubaker, Tunisian writer
 Michael Gira, American musician
 Sócrates, Brazilian footballer (d. 2011)
 February 20
 Anthony Head, English actor, musician
 Patty Hearst, American heiress and kidnap victim
 February 23 – Viktor Yushchenko, President of Ukraine
 February 24 – Sid Meier, Canadian programmer, game designer, notable for the Civilization series
 February 25 – Gerardo Pelusso, Uruguayan football manager
 February 26 – Recep Tayyip Erdoğan, 12th President of Turkey

March

 March 1
 Peter Spellos, American actor, voice actor
 Catherine Bach, American actress (The Dukes of Hazzard)
 Ron Howard, American actor, director, producer (The Andy Griffith Show, Happy Days)
 March 2
 Ed Johnstone, Canadian ice hockey player
 Gara Takashima, Japanese voice actress
 March 4
 François Fillon, Prime Minister of France
 Catherine O'Hara, Canadian actress (SCTV)
 Irina Ratushinskaya, Russian writer
 Willie Thorne, English snooker player (d. 2020)
 March 5 – João Lourenço, President of Angola
 March 6 – Harald Schumacher, German football goalkeeper
 March 8
 Marie-Theres Nadig, Swiss alpine skier
 David Wilkie, Scottish former world record holder, Olympic gold medallist swimmer (1976)
 March 9
 Bobby Sands, Irish republican hunger striker (d. 1981)
 Kevin Wade, American screenwriter, television producer
 March 11 – Nicolae Manea, Romanian football player, manager (d. 2014)
 March 13 – The Baroness Amos, British politician
 March 15
 Massimo Bubola, Italian singer, songwriter
 Craig Wasson, American actor
 March 16
 S.A. Griffin, American actor, poet
 Nancy Wilson, American rock musician
 Jimmy Nail, English singer, songwriter, actor, film producer, and television writer
 March 17 – Lesley-Anne Down, British actress
 March 18 – James F. Reilly, American astronaut
 March 19 – Indu Shahani, Indian educator, Sheriff of Mumbai
 March 20 – Louis Sachar, American author
 March 23
 Geno Auriemma, American basketball coach
 Hideyuki Hori, Japanese voice actor
 March 24
 Mike Braun, American businessman and politician
 Robert Carradine, American actor
 Donna Pescow, American actress, director (Angie)
 Rafael Orozco Maestre, Colombian singer (d. 1992)
 March 26
 Wendy Fulton, American actress
 Kazuhiko Inoue, Japanese voice actor
 Clive Palmer, Australian mining tycoon
 March 29 – Karen Ann Quinlan, American right-to-die cause célèbre (d. 1985)

April

 April 1
 Dieter Müller, German soccer player
 Jeff Porcaro, American drummer, songwriter (Toto) (d. 1992)
 April 2 – Susumu Hirasawa, Japanese musician
 April 4
 Mary-Margaret Humes, American actress
 Tom Ruegger, American animator, screenwriter, storyboard artist, and lyricist
 April 5
 David Edward Maust, American serial killer (d. 2006)
 Guy Bertrand, Canadian linguist, radio/television personality
 April 6
 Judi Bowker, English actress
 Michael Simms, American poet, publisher; founded Autumn House Press
 April 7
 Jackie Chan, Hong Kong-born actor, martial artist
 Tony Dorsett, American football player
 April 8 – Gary Carter, American baseball player (d. 2012)
 April 9
 Steve Holt, Canadian musician
 Dennis Quaid, American actor
 Lim Hng Kiang, Singaporean politician
 April 10
 Anacani, Mexican-born American singer (The Lawrence Welk Show)
 Angelika Hellmann, East German artistic gymnast
 April 14 
 Katsuhiro Otomo, Japanese manga artist (Akira) 
 Bruce Sterling, American science fiction writer
 April 16 – Ellen Barkin, American actress
 April 17
 Norio Imamura, Japanese voice actor
 Roddy Piper, Canadian wrestler (d. 2015)
 April 22 – Jōji Nakata, Japanese voice actor
 April 23
 Peter Nyombi, Ugandan lawyer, politician (d. 2018)
 Michael Moore, American filmmaker, political activist (Bowling for Columbine)
 Lea Black, American philanthropist, author, television personality, political activist and entrepreneur
 April 25
 Randy Cross, American football analyst and former player
 April 27
 Herman Edwards, American football head coach
 Frank Bainimarama, Fijian politician
 April 28 – Michael Daugherty, American composer
 April 29
 Jake Burton Carpenter, American founder of Burton Snowboards (d. 2019)
 Kazuko Kurosawa, Japanese costume designer
 Jerry Seinfeld, American actor, comedian and producer (Seinfeld)
 April 30 – Jane Campion, New Zealand screenwriter, producer, and director

May

 May 1
 Ray Parker Jr., African-American musician and composer ("Ghostbusters")
 Maatia Toafa, 2-time prime minister of Tuvalu
 May 2 – Elliot Goldenthal, American composer
 May 5 – David Azulai, Israeli politician (d. 2018)
 May 6 – Angela Hernández Nuñez, Dominican writer
 May 7
 Philippe Geluck, Belgian cartoonist
 Amy Heckerling, American film director
 Diana Raab, American author
 May 8 – Pam Arciero, Hawaiian-born puppeteer (Sesame Street)
 May 10 – Amos Guttman, Israeli film director (d. 1993)
 May 13 – Johnny Logan, Australian-born Irish singer, composer and Eurovision Song Contest winner (1980, 1987) dubbed as "Mister Eurovision"
 May 14
 María Dolores Katarain ("Yoyes"), Spanish Basque separatist leader (d. 1986)
 Peter J. Ratcliffe, English cellular biologist, Nobel Prize laureate
 May 19
 Hōchū Ōtsuka, Japanese voice actor
 Phil Rudd, Australian rock drummer (AC/DC)
 May 20 – David Paterson, American politician, 55th Governor of New York
 May 22 – Shuji Nakamura, Japanese electronics engineer
 May 23 – Marvelous Marvin Hagler, American middleweight boxer and film actor (d. 2021)
 May 25
 Tantely Andrianarivo, 11th prime minister of Madagascar
 Sudirman, Malaysian singer and songwriter (d. 1992)
 May 27
 Pauline Hanson, Australian politician
 Lawrence M. Krauss, American theoretical physicist, science writer
 Coney Reyes, Philippine film and television actress
 May 28 – John Tory, Canadian politician
 May 29 – Pankaj Kapur, Indian actor

June

 June 2
 Mattos Nascimento, Brazilian musician, singer, composer and trombonist
 Dennis Haysbert, African-American actor
 Chiyoko Kawashima, Japanese voice actress
 June 4 – Kazuhiro Yamaji, Japanese actor, voice actor
 June 5
 Hashim Djojohadikusumo, Indonesian entrepreneur, politician
 Nancy Stafford, American actress, Christian author
 June 6 – Harvey Fierstein, American actor
 June 9
 John Hagelin, American physicist, U.S. presidential candidate
 Elizabeth May, leader of the Green Party of Canada
 June 10 – Kurt Walker, American ice hockey player (d. 2018)
 June 13 – Ngozi Okonjo-Iweala, Nigerian-born Director-General of the World Trade Organization
 June 14 – Will Patton, American actor
 June 15
 Jim Belushi, American actor, comedian, singer and musician
 Bob McDonnell, American politician
 June 16 – Sergey Kuryokhin, Russian pianist, composer, improvisor, performance artist and actor (d. 1996)
 June 19
 Ted Coombs, American artist
 Kathleen Turner, American actress (Romancing the Stone)
 June 20
 Michael Anthony, American rock bassist (Van Halen)
 Karlheinz Brandenburg, German electrical engineer, mathematician
 Ilan Ramon, Israeli Air Force fighter pilot, Israel's first astronaut (d. 2003)
 June 21
 Chip Ingram, American Christian pastor, author and orator
 Mark Kimmitt, U.S general
 Anne Kirkbride, British actress (Coronation Street) (d. 2015)
 Robert Pastorelli, American actor (d. 2004)
 Jim Tooey, American actor
 June 22
 Chris Lemmon, American actor, author
 Freddie Prinze, American actor, comedian (Chico and the Man) (d. 1977)
 June 23
 Francisco Javier Cuadra, Chilean lawyer, academic and politician
 Carme Pinós, Spanish architect 
 James Plaskitt, British politician
 June 24 – Chang San-cheng, Taiwanese politician
 June 25
 Luiz Carlos Vasconcelos, Brazilian actor
 Sonia Sotomayor, Associate Justice of the Supreme Court of the United States
 Igor Lisovsky, Soviet pair skater
 Abderrazak Kilani, Tunisian politician, lawyer
 June 26 – Steve Barton, American actor (d. 2001)
 June 27
 Ron Kirk, Mayor of Dallas, Texas
 Anita Zagaria, Italian actress
 June 28
 Daniel Dantas, Brazilian actor
 Ava Barber, American country singer (The Lawrence Welk Show)
 Alice Krige, South African actress and producer
 June 29
 Jai Jagadish, Indian film actor, director and producer
 Rick Honeycutt, American baseball player, coach
 June 30
 Serzh Sargsyan, President of Armenia
 Stephen Ouimette, Canadian actor, director
 Mohammad A. Quayum, Bangladeshi academic, writer, editor, critic and translator
 Wayne Swan, Australian politician
 Pierre Charles, Prime Minister of Dominica (d. 2004)

July

 July 1
 Sharif Hassan Sheikh Aden, Somali politician
 Pedro Guastavino, Argentine politician
 Lawrence Gonzi, Maltese politician and lawyer
 Abu Mahdi al-Muhandis, Iraqi-Iranian military commander (d. 2020)
 Hossein Nuri, Iranian artist
 July 2
 Ludmila Aslanian, Armenian chess player
 Peter Randall-Page, British artist
 Wendy Schaal, American actress
 July 3 – Pennie Lane Trumbull, American socialite, philanthropist, businesswoman, and entrepreneur
 July 4 – Anne Lambton, British actress
 July 5
 Don Stark, American actor
 John Wright, New Zealand cricket captain
 July 6 – Willie Randolph, American baseball player, coach, manager
 July 7
 Robert M. Price, American theologian and writer, Cthulhu Mythos scholar and editor
 Simon Anderson, Australian competitive surfer, surfboard shaper, and writer
 Ursula Stephens, Australian politician
 July 8
 David Aaronovitch, English journalist, television presenter and author
 Matthew Marsh, English actor
 July 9 – Kevin O'Leary, Canadian businessman, television personality, and political candidate
 July 10
 Andre Dawson, American baseball player
 Michele Serra, Italian writer, journalist and satirist
 Neil Tennant, British singer-songwriter, musician and journalist (Pet Shop Boys)
 Yō Yoshimura, Japanese voice actor (d. 1991)
 José González Ganoza, Peruvian footballer (d. 1987)
 July 11 – Alejandro Camacho, Mexican actor and producer
 July 12
 Lisa Pelikan, American actress
 Paulo Saldiva, Brazilian professor, physician, pathologist and medical researcher
 July 13 
 Sezen Aksu, Turkish singer
 Lim Swee Say, Singaporean politician 
 July 15
 Neil Brewer, British musician and songwriter
 Tarak Dhiab, Tunisian footballer
 John Ferguson, Australian rugby league player
 Mario Kempes, Argentine footballer
 Jeff Jarvis, American journalist, professor, public speaker and television critic
 July 16
 Nicholas Frankau, English actor
 Jeanette Mott Oxford, American politician
 July 17
 Angela Merkel, 8th Chancellor of Germany
 Richard Bekins, American actor
 Edward Natapei, Vanuatu politician and Prime Minister of Vanuatu (d. 2015)
 J. Michael Straczynski, American author
 July 18 – Franziska Troegner, German actress
 July 19 – Verica Kalanović, Serbian politician
 July 20
 Lo Ta-yu, Taiwanese singer and songwriter
 Nguyễn Xuân Phúc, Vietnamese politician; 10th President of Vietnam, 7th Prime Minister of Vietnam
 Wilson Casey, American syndicated columnist and entertainer
 July 21 – Otto Jespersen, Norwegian comedian, actor and television personality
 July 22 – Pierre Lebeau, Canadian actor
 July 24
 Michael H. O'Brien, American politician (d. 2018)
 Jorge Jesus, Portuguese football player and coach
 July 25 – Walter Payton, African-American football player (d. 1999)
 July 26
 Vitas Gerulaitis, American tennis player (d. 1994)
 Leonardo Daniel, Mexican actor and director
 July 27
 Philippe Alliot, French race car driver
 Lynne Frederick, British actress (d. 1994)
 July 28 – Hugo Chávez, President of Venezuela (d. 2013)
 July 29 – Mark Gersmehl, American Christian musician

August

 August 1
 Baba Gurinder Singh, Fifth and Present Satguru of Radha Soami Satsang Beas
 Philip Trenary, American businessman (d. 2018)
 Michael Badnarik, American software engineer and presidential candidate
 James Gleick, American non fiction author of several award-winning books.
 Junpei Morita, Japanese actor and voice actor
 August 2 – David Tang, Hong Kong-British entrepreneur and philanthropist (d. 2017)
 August 4
 Dorottya Udvaros, Hungarian actress
 François Valéry, French singer-songwriter and composer
 Uwe Wittwer, Swiss artist
 August 7 – Susanna Javicoli, Italian actress (d. 2005)
 August 9 – Pete Thomas, British drummer for the Elvis Costello band
 August 11 – Joe Jackson, British singer-songwriter (Steppin' Out)
 August 12
 François Hollande, President of France 2012–17
 Sam J. Jones, American actor
 Pat Metheny, American jazz guitarist
 August 13
 Nico Assumpção, Brazilian bass guitar player (d. 2001)
 Tõnu Kilgas, Estonian singer and actor
 August 14
 Mark Fidrych, American baseball player (d. 2009)
 Stanley A. McChrystal, U.S. Army general
 August 16
 James Cameron, Canadian-born film director
 George Galloway, British politician
 August 17
 Anatoly Kudryavitsky, Russian-Irish writer
 Andrés Pastrana Arango, President of Colombia
 August 20
 Tawn Mastrey, American disc jockey and music video producer (d. 2007)
 Al Roker, American television personality and host
 Richarda Schmeisser, East German artistic gymnast
 August 21
 Steve Smith, American drummer
 Ivan Stang, American author and publisher
 August 22 – Jay Patterson, American actor
 August 23
 Ian Bartholomew, English actor
 Charles Busch, American director, writer and actor
 Halimah Yacob, 8th president of Singapore
 August 24
 Joe Ochman, American actor and voice actor
 Philippe Cataldo, French singer
 August 25
 Bruno Manser, Swiss environmental activist (d. 2005)
 Elvis Costello, English singer-songwriter
 August 29 – István Cserháti, Hungarian keyboardist (d. 2005)
 August 30 – Alexander Lukashenko, President of Belarus
 August 31
 Robert Kocharyan, President of Armenia
 Caroline Cossey, British model

September

 September 1 – Dave Lumley, Canadian ice hockey player
 September 2
 Andrej Babiš, Czech entrepreneur and politician, 12th Prime Minister of the Czech Republic
 Vance DeGeneres, American actor
 Zeta Emilianidou, Cypriot lawyer and politician (d. 2022)
 Gai Waterhouse, Australian racehorse trainer
 Humberto Zurita, Mexican actor, director and producer
 September 5 – Danny Masterton, Scottish footballer (d. 2020)
 September 6 – Carly Fiorina, American businesswoman, CEO of HP (1999-2005) and Senator Ted Cruz's running mate in the 2016 presidential election
 September 7
 Corbin Bernsen, American actor
 Michael Emerson, American actor
 Francisco Guterres, 4th president of East Timor
 September 9 – Mohsen Rezaee, Iranian politician
 September 10 – Mark W. Everson, American businessman; 46th Commissioner of the Internal Revenue Service (2003–07)
 September 13 
 Steve Kilbey, Australian musician
 George Yeo, Singaporean politician
 September 14 – Buzz Schneider, American professional ice hockey player
 September 15 – Nava Semel, Israeli author and playwright (d. 2017)
 September 16 – Ashrita Furman, American record breaker
 September 17
 Wayne Krenchicki, American baseball player (d. 2018)
 Joël-François Durand, French composer
 September 18 – Dennis Johnson, American basketball player (d. 2007)
 September 21
 Shinzō Abe, Prime Minister of Japan (d. 2022)
 Thomas S. Ray, American ecologist
 Cass Sunstein, American legal scholar
 Phil "Philthy Animal" Taylor, English drummer (Motörhead and Waysted)
 September 23 – Cherie Blair, lawyer, wife of British Prime Minister Tony Blair
 September 24 – Lilian Mercedes Letona, Salvadoran guerrilla (d. 1983)
 September 26 – Kevin Kennedy, American baseball manager and television host
 September 28 
 Steve Largent, American football player and congressman
 Margot Wallström, Swedish politician
 September 29 – Cindy Morgan, American actress
 September 30
 Barry Williams, American actor
 Patrice Rushen, African-American singer

October

 October 1 – Martin Strel, Slovenian swimmer
 October 2 – Wong Tien Fatt, Malaysian politician (d. 2019)
 October 3
 Eddie DeGarmo, American Christian keyboardist and producer
 Dennis Eckersley, American baseball player
 Al Sharpton, African-American civil rights activist, minister and radio talk show host
 Dawayne Bailey, American musician
 Stevie Ray Vaughan, American musician (d. 1990)
 October 5
 Gurudas Kamat, Indian politician (d. 2018)
 Wayne Watson, American Christian musician
 October 6 – Howard Hoffman, American voice actor
 October 7 – Robert A. Schuller, American televangelist and the son of Robert Schuller
 October 9
 Scott Bakula, American actor (Quantum Leap, Star Trek: Enterprise)
 John O'Hurley, American actor and game show host
 October 10
 Mohamed Mounir, Egyptian singer and actor
 David Lee Roth, American rock singer
 October 12
 Evalie A. Bradley, Anguillian politician and member of the House of Assembly of Anguilla.
 Linval Thompson, Jamaican singer and producer
 October 13 – Mordechai Vanunu, a former Israeli nuclear technician who revealed secrets of its nuclear weapons program
 October 14 – Mohamad Sabu, Malaysian politician
 October 15
 Peter Bakowski, Australian poet
 Michael Garner, English actor
 October 18 – Yūji Mitsuya, Japanese voice actor
 October 19
 Ken Stott, Scottish actor
 Ronnie Leitch, Sri Lankan singer and actor (d. 2018)
 October 21 – Brian Tobin, sixth Premier of Newfoundland and Labrador.
 October 22 – Ellen Gerstell, American voice actress
 October 23 – Ang Lee, Taiwanese film director
 October 24
 Doug Davidson, American actor
 Mike Rounds, South Dakota politician
 Malcolm Turnbull, 28th Prime Minister of Australia
 October 25
 Laxmikant Berde, Indian actor (d. 2004)
 Mike Eruzione, American ice hockey player
 October 26
 Farit Ismeth Emir, Malaysian news anchor (d. 2020)
 Carlos Agostinho do Rosário, Mozambican politician
 Victor Ciorbea, 56th prime minister of Romania
 October 30
 Kathleen Cody, American actress
 Mario Testino, Peruvian photographer

November

 November 2 – Angela Webber, Australian author, television writer, producer and comedian (d. 2007)
 November 3
 Adam Ant, British rock singer and musician
 Brigitte Lin, Taiwanese actress
 Kathy Kinney, American actress and comedian
 November 5 
 Mike Gabriel, American animator and film producer
 Alejandro Sabella, Argentine footballer and manager (d. 2020)
 November 6 – Karin Fossum, Norwegian crime fiction writer
 November 7
 Robin Beck, American singer
 Kamal Haasan, Indian actor, dancer, film director, screenwriter, producer and politician
 Jon Taffer, American bar consultant, television host and author
 November 8
 Michael D. Brown, first Undersecretary of Emergency Preparedness and Response, a division of the United States' Department of Homeland Security
 Kazuo Ishiguro, Japanese-born British author, Nobel Prize laureate
 November 11 – Mary Gaitskill, American novelist
 November 12 – Rhonda Shear, American television hostess, actress and comedian
 November 13 – Chris Noth, American actor
 November 14
 Yanni, Greek musician
 Robert Alberts, Dutch footballer and manager of Persib Bandung
 Willie Hernández, Puerto Rican Major League Baseball player
 Bernard Hinault, French road bicycle racer
 Condoleezza Rice, American politician, 66th United States Secretary of State
 November 15
 Stephen W. Burns, American actor (d. 1990)
 Aleksander Kwaśniewski, President of Poland
 November 16 – Bruce Edwards, American golf caddy (d. 2004)
 November 19
 Abdel Fattah el-Sisi, President of Egypt
 Kathleen Quinlan, American actress
 November 20 – Bin Shimada, Japanese voice actor
 November 22 – Paolo Gentiloni, Prime Minister of Italy
 November 23
 Bruce Hornsby, American rock singer
 Aavo Pikkuus, Estonian-Soviet cyclist
 Elizabeth Savalla, Brazilian actress
 November 26
 Roz Chast, American cartoonist
 Dan Kwong, American performance artist and playwright
 November 27
 Patricia McPherson, American actress
 Kimmy Robertson, American actress
 November 28 – Marty Grabstein, American actor and voice actor
 November 29 – Joel Coen, American film director, producer, screenwriter and editor
 November – Pierre M'Pelé, African public health personality and writer

December

 December 1 – Bob Goen, American television personality and game show host
 December 2
 Dan Butler, American actor and voice actor
 Stone Phillips, American television journalist
 December 3 – Grace Andreacchi, American author
 December 4 – Tony Todd, American actor and producer
 December 6 – Beat Furrer, Swiss-born Austrian composer and conductor
 December 7 – Mark Hofmann, American forger and murderer
 December 8 – Sumi Shimamoto, Japanese voice actress
 December 9 – Jean-Claude Juncker,  Luxembourg politician 
 December 10 – Jack Hues, English singer and musician (Wang Chung)
 December 11
 Sylvester Clarke, West Indian cricketer (d. 1999)
 Jermaine Jackson, African-American singer and actor
 Prachanda, Nepalese Communist leader
 December 13 – John Anderson, American country music singer-songwriter
 December 14
 Ib Andersen, Danish dancer
 Alan Kulwicki, American race car driver (d. 1993)
 December 15 – Mark Warner, American politician
 December 18
 Uli Jon Roth, German rock guitarist (Scorpions)
 Ray Liotta, American actor and producer (Goodfellas) (d. 2022)
 December 20
 Binali Yildirim, Prime Minister of Turkey
 Sandra Cisneros, American writer
 December 21 – Chris Evert, American tennis player
 December 23 – Brian Teacher, American tennis player
 December 24 – José María Figueres, Costa Rican politician, President (1994–1998)
 December 25
 Roman Baskin, Estonian actor and director of stage and screen (d. 2018)
 Annie Lennox, British pop musician and lead singer of Eurythmics
 December 26
 Susan Butcher, American dog-sled racer (d. 2006)
 Ozzie Smith, HOF baseball shortstop
 December 27 – Teo Chee Hean, Singaporean politician and 5th Senior Minister of Singapore
 December 28
 Gayle King, African-American television personality, journalist, and author
 Lanny Poffo, American professional wrestler
 Denzel Washington, African-American actor
 December 29
 Wang Huanyu, Chinese astrophysicist (d. 2018)
 Albrecht Böttcher, German mathematician
 Roger Voudouris, American singer-songwriter and guitarist (d. 2003)
 December 31 – Alex Salmond, Scottish politician

Date not known
Marek Smurzyński, Polish translator, Persian language speaker and translator (d. 2009)

Deaths

January
 January 5
 Rabbit Maranville, American baseball player (Boston Braves) and a member of the MLB Hall of Fame (b. 1891)
 Lillian Rich, English actress (b. 1900)
 January 8 – Eduard Wiiralt, Estonian artist (b. 1898)
 January 19 – Alice Jouenne, French educator and socialist activist (b. 1873)ref name="Sowerwine1978"></ref>
 January 11 
 John Simon, 1st Viscount Simon, British politician (b. 1873)
 Oscar Straus, Austrian composer (b. 1870)
 January 12
 William H. P. Blandy, American admiral (b. 1890)
 Elmer H. Geran, American politician (b. 1875)
 January 18 – Sydney Greenstreet, English actor (b. 1879)
 January 20 – Fred Root, English cricketer (b. 1890)
 January 30
 John Murray Anderson, Canadian theater director and producer (b. 1886)
 Dorothy Price, Irish physician (b. 1890)
 January 31
 Edwin Howard Armstrong, American electrical engineer (b. 1890)
 Florence Bates, American actress (b. 1888)

February
 February 6 – Maxwell Bodenheim, American poet and novelist (murdered) (b. 1892)
 February 8 – Laurence Trimble, American actor (b. 1885)
 February 9 – Mabel Paige, American actress (b. 1880)
 February 11 – Thomas Pierrepoint, British executioner (b. 1870)
 February 12 – Dziga Vertov, Russian filmmaker (b. 1896)
 February 19 – Axel Pehrsson-Bramstorp, 24th Prime Minister of Sweden (b. 1883)
 February 21 – William K. Howard, American film director (b. 1899)

March

 March 7
 Otto Diels, German chemist, Nobel Prize laureate (b. 1876)
 Will H. Hays, Namesake for the Hays Code (b. 1879)
 March 9 – Vagn Walfrid Ekman, Swedish oceanographer (b. 1874)
 March 12 – Marianne Weber, German sociologist and suffragist (b. 1870)
 March 13 – Cesar Klein, German painter (b. 1876)
 March 24 – Thành Thái, Emperor of Vietnam (b. 1879)
 March 26 – Louis Silvers, American film composer (b. 1889)
 March 30 
 Horatio Dresser, American writer (b. 1866)
 Fritz London, German physicist (b. 1900)

April
 April 2 
 Hoyt Vandenberg, U.S. Air Force general (b. 1899)
 Maud Barger-Wallach, American tennis player (b. 1870)
 April 3 – Aristides de Sousa Mendes, Portuguese diplomat and humanitarian (b. 1885)
 April 7 – Saburō Kurusu, Japanese diplomat (b. 1886)
 April 8 
 Winnifred Eaton, Canadian author (b. 1875)
 Fritzi Scheff, Austrian-born American actress and singer (b. 1879)
 April 10 – Auguste Lumière, French film pioneer (b. 1862)
 April 12 – Luis Cabrera Lobato, Mexican lawyer, politician and writer (b. 1876)
 April 13 – Angus Lewis Macdonald, Nova Scotia Premier (b. 1890)
 April 17 – Lucrețiu Pătrășcanu, Romanian communist activist and sociologist (b. 1900)
 April 27 
 Antoni Bolesław Dobrowolski, Polish scientist and explorer who participated in the Belgian Antarctic expedition (b. 1872)
 Thorvald Ellegaard, Danish track cyclist (b. 1877)
 April 28 – Léon Jouhaux, French labor leader, recipient of the Nobel Peace Prize (b. 1879)
 April 29 – Joe May, Austrian-born film director (b. 1880)

May
 May 1 – Tom Tyler, American actor (b. 1903)
 May 3 – Józef Garbień, Polish footballer and physician (b. 1896)
 May 5 – Henri Laurens, French sculptor and illustrator (b. 1885)
 May 6 – B. C. Forbes, Scottish-born publisher (b. 1880)
 May 14 – Heinz Guderian, German World War II general (b. 1888)
 May 15 – William March, American writer and soldier (b. 1893)
 May 19 – Charles Ives, American composer (b. 1874)
 May 22 – Chief Bender, Native-American baseball player (Philadelphia Athletics) and a member of the MLB Hall of Fame (b. 1884)
 May 25 – Robert Capa, Hungarian-born photojournalist (b. 1913)
 May 26 – Omer Nishani, former Chairman of the Presidium of the People's Assembly and head of State of Albania (b. 1887)

June

 June 7 – Alan Turing, British mathematician, cryptanalyst, and pioneer computer scientist (b. 1912)
 June 9 – Alain LeRoy Locke,  American writer, philosopher and educator (b. 1885)
 June 21 – Harvey A. Carr, American psychologists (b. 1873)
 June 22 – Don Hollenbeck, American newscaster (b. 1905)
 June 24 – Thomas Denman, 3rd Baron Denman, 5th Governor-General of Australia (b. 1874)
 June 27 – Alfredo Versoza, Filipino Roman Catholic bishop and Servant of God (b. 1877)
 June 30 – Andrass Samuelsen, 1st prime minister of Faroe Islands (b. 1873)

July

 July 1 
 Thea von Harbou, German actress (b. 1888)
 Tomás Monje , 41st President of Bolivia (b. 1884)
 July 3 – Reginald Marsh, American painter (b. 1898)
 July 4 – Maria Ripamonti, Italian Roman Catholic and a professed religious from the Ancelle della carità (b. 1909)
 July 6
 Gabriel Pascal, Hungarian-born film producer and director (b. 1894)
 Cornelia Sorabji, Indian-born lawyer (b. 1866)
 July 11 – Henry Valentine Knaggs, English physician and author (b. 1859)
 July 13
 Frida Kahlo, Mexican painter (b. 1907)
 Irving Pichel, American actor and director (b. 1891)
 Grantland Rice, American sportswriter (b. 1880)
 July 14
 Jacinto Benavente, Spanish dramatist, Nobel Prize laureate (b. 1866)
 Jackie Saunders, American silent screen actress (b. 1892)
 July 16 – Herms Niel, German composer (b. 1888)
 July 17 – Machine Gun Kelly, American gangster (b. 1895)
 July 19 – Hannes Meyer, Swiss architect (b. 1889)
 July 28 – Sōjin Kamiyama or "Sojin", Japanese film star during the American silent film era (b. 1884)
 July 31 – Princess Antonia of Luxembourg, Luxembourg aristocrat (b. 1899)

August

 August 3
 Bess Streeter Aldrich, American writer (b. 1881)
 Colette, French novelist (b. 1873)
 August 14 – Hugo Eckener, German president of the Zeppelin Dirigible Company (b. 1868)
 August 19 – Alcide De Gasperi, Italian statesman and Christian Democracy politician, 30th Prime Minister of Italy (b. 1881)
 August 21 – Marin Ceaușu, Romanian general (b. 1891)
 August 24 – Getúlio Vargas, 14th and 17th President of Brazil (suicide) (b. 1882)
 August 31 – Elsa Barker, American writer (b. 1869)

September

 September 1 – Bert Acosta, American aviator (b. 1895)
 September 2 – Franz Leopold Neumann,  German- political activist and Marxist theorist (b. 1900)
 September 3 – Eugene Pallette, American actor (b. 1889)
 September 5 – Eugen Schiffer, German politician (b. 1860)
 September 6 – Edward C. Kalbfus, American admiral (b. 1877)
 September 7
 Bud Fisher, American cartoonist (b. 1885)
 Glenn Scobey Warner, American college football coach (b. 1871)
 September 8 – André Derain, French artist, painter and sculptor (b. 1880)
 September 20 – Washington Phillips, American gospel singer and instrumentalist (b. 1880)
 September 21 – Mikimoto Kōkichi, Japanese pearl farm pioneer (b. 1858)
 September 24 – Edward Pilgrim, British homeowner (suicide) (b. 1904)
 September 25 – Eugenio d'Ors, Spanish writer (b. 1881)
 September 26 – Ellen Roosevelt, American tennis player (b. 1868)
 September 27 – Maximilian von Weichs, German field marshal (b. 1881)
 September 28 – Bert Lytell, American actor (b. 1885)
 September 29 – Martin Wetzer, Finnish general (b. 1868)

October
 October 1 – René Le Senne, French philosopher and psychologist (b. 1882)
 October 9 – Robert H. Jackson, United States Supreme Court associate justice and chief prosecutor at the Nuremberg Trials (b. 1892)
 October 12 – George Welch, American aviator (b. 1918)
 October 18 – Mieczysław Norwid-Neugebauer, Polish general and politician (b. 1884)
 October 19 – Hugh Duffy, American baseball player (Boston Braves) and a member of the MLB Hall of Fame (b. 1866)
 October 22 – Jibanananda Das, Indian poet, writer, novelist and essayist in Bengali (b. 1899)
 October 30 – Wilbur Shaw, American racing driver (b. 1902)

November

 November 3 – Henri Matisse, French painter (b. 1869)
 November 10 – Édouard Le Roy,  French philosopher and mathematician (b. 1870)
 November 13 – Paul Ludwig Ewald von Kleist, German field marshal (b. 1881)
 November 15 – Lionel Barrymore, American actor (b. 1878)
 November 16 – Albert Francis Blakeslee, American botanist (b. 1874)
 November 17 
 Ludovic Dauș, Romanian novelist and playwright (b. 1873)
 Yitzhak Lamdan, Russian-born Israeli poet and columnist (b. 1899)
 November 20 – Clyde Cessna, American aviator and aircraft designer and manufacturer, founder of the Cessna Aircraft Corporation (b. 1879)
 November 21 – Jess McMahon, American professional boxing and wrestling promoter; founder of Capitol Wrestling Corporation (b. 1882)
 November 22
 Moroni Olsen, American actor (b. 1889)
 Andrey Vyshinsky, Russian jurist and diplomat, former Soviet Foreign Minister (b. 1883)
 November 28 – Enrico Fermi, Italian physicist, Nobel Prize laureate (b. 1901)
 November 29 – Dink Johnson, American musician (b. 1892)
 November 30 – Wilhelm Furtwängler, German conductor (b. 1886)

December
 December 1 – Fred Rose, American songwriter (b. 1898)
 December 8
 Claude Cahun, French photographer and writer (b. 1894)
 Gladys George, American actress (b. 1904)
 December 20 – James Hilton, English novelist (b. 1900)
 December 23 – René Iché, French sculptor (b. 1897)
 December 25 
 Ioan Arbore, Romanian general (b. 1892)
 Liberty Hyde Bailey, American botanist (b. 1858) 
 December 30
 Archduke Eugen of Austria, Austrian field marshal (b. 1863)
 Günther Quandt, German industrialist who founded an industrial empire that today includes BMW and Altana (b. 1881)

Nobel Prizes

 Physics – Max Born, Walther Bothe
 Chemistry – Linus Pauling
 Medicine – John Franklin Enders, Thomas Huckle Weller, Frederick Chapman Robbins
 Literature – Ernest Hemingway
 Peace – The Office of the United Nations High Commissioner for Refugees.

References